Brendan Halligan (5 July 1936 – 9 August 2020) was an Irish economist and politician. He was founder and president of the Institute of International and European Affairs (IIEA), a think tank on European and international issues. He was president of the Ireland China Institute, an independent think tank based in Dublin, Ireland, which was officially launched in October 2019. His career spanned Irish public sector bodies and work in the private sector. At various times he was General Secretary of the Labour Party, a Teachta Dála (TD), a Senator, and a Member of the European Parliament (MEP).

Early life and education
Halligan was born in Dublin in 1936. He grew up in Rialto and was educated at St James's Christian Brothers School, Dublin. He studied in Dublin Institute of Technology and became a chemical analyst in the CIÉ depot in Inchicore. He and three friends decided to go to university and formed a co-operative and worked at various jobs in London to fund their studies. In 1959, he began an economics and law degree at University College Dublin. There he was influenced by lecturers including George O’Brien, Patrick Lynch and Garret FitzGerald. He received a master's degree in economics from UCD in 1964.

Career
Following an early career as an economist, working with the Irish Sugar Company until 1967, he became involved in politics. In that year, he became General Secretary of the Labour Party.

The party leader, Brendan Corish, relied on Halligan's intellectual and political skills in his new role. Under Halligan, the party underwent an energetic reorganisation. New structures and policies were put in place, coinciding with the party's leftward policy shift and an acute anti-coalition stance. He strongly supported both approaches, but was instrumental in securing the party's eventual, somewhat unwilling, reversal of its anti-coalition stance after its disappointing result in the 1969 general election. The 1973 general election resulted in a Fine Gael-Labour Party coalition government coming to power.

Halligan was appointed to Seanad Éireann in 1973; three years later, he won a by-election in Dublin South-West, and thus became a TD. After boundary changes, he stood in the new Dublin Finglas at the 1977 general election, but was not elected. Halligan stood again in the revived Dublin North-West constituency at the 1981 and November 1982 general elections, but again was not elected.

He continued to serve as General Secretary of the party until 1980, and was appointed a Member of the European Parliament (MEP) from 1983 until 1984, replacing Frank Cluskey, where he specialised in economic affairs and energy policy.

In 1980, Halligan set up CIPA, his own public affairs consultancy based in Dublin, and became a lecturer in Economics at the University of Limerick. He was also chairman of European Movement Ireland during the late 1980s. In 1985, he was appointed as Chairman of Bórd na Móna, the Irish Peat Development Authority, a position he held for ten years. In 1989 he founded the Institute of European Affairs (IEA), which later became the IIEA. He was Director of CIPA until 2014.

Resulting from his keen interest and experience in energy policy and renewable energy, Halligan served as Chair of the Sustainable Energy Authority of Ireland from 2007 until 2014. He was President of the IIEA, and he was also a Board Member of Mainstream Renewable Energy.

In later years he also worked on the foundation and development of the Ireland China Institute (ICI), which, with its maxim bridging the gap between knowledge and understanding, seeks to strengthen Irish-Chinese diplomatic relations, developing cultural links and fostering a deeper understanding of the respective cultural norms and values between the two nations. He was also President of ICI.

Death
Halligan died on 9 August 2020 after a long illness. On his death, Taoiseach Mícheál Martin described him as “a man who gave his life to politics and the public service with a deep commitment to the institutions of the state”. European Commissioner for Trade Phil Hogan stated that “Brendan was a committed European to his fingertips.  He was a pragmatic European intellectual, in the tradition of Spinelli, Monnet and Schuman.”.

Honours and awards
 Chevalier de Légion d’Honneur (France, 2016)
 Honorary Doctorate of Literature, (University College Dublin, 2010)

Selected publications

References

External links

1936 births
2020 deaths
Chevaliers of the Légion d'honneur
Institute of European Affairs
20th-century Irish economists
Labour Party (Ireland) MEPs
Labour Party (Ireland) TDs
Members of the 20th Dáil
Members of the 13th Seanad
MEPs for the Republic of Ireland 1979–1984
Politicians from County Dublin
Alumni of Dublin Institute of Technology
Nominated members of Seanad Éireann
Labour Party (Ireland) senators